EB-3 or EB3 may refer to:
EB-3 visa, a U.S. immigrant visa preference category
Gibson EB-3, an electric bass guitar 
EB3, a Honda E engine
EB3, or MAPRE3, a protein